Unapologetically is the second studio album by American country pop singer Kelsea Ballerini. It was released on November 3, 2017. Ballerini announced the album's title and release date on July 25, 2017. In August, the album's track listing was first revealed to fans during a four-day check-in event over the mobile app Swarm.

A deluxe edition of the album with four new bonus tracks was released on October 26, 2018.

Singles
The album's lead single, "Legends," was first released on June 7, 2017, and went for adds at country radio on July 10, 2017. It became Ballerini's fourth number one hit on the Billboard Country Airplay chart for the week dated February 24, 2018.

"I Hate Love Songs" was released on March 12, 2018 as the album's second official single. It reached a peak of number 25 on the Billboard Country Airplay chart.

"Miss Me More" was released as the third single from the album on October 15, 2018. It reached a peak of number 2 on the Billboard Country Airplay chart.

Promotional singles
The album's title track, "Unapologetically", was released as a promotional single on August 11, 2017, the day the album became available for pre-order on iTunes. The second promotional single, "High School", was released on September 22, 2017. The third and final promotional single, "Miss Me More", was released on October 20, 2017.

Critical reception

At review aggregation website Metacritic, Unapologetically has a weighted average score of 74 out of 100, based on 4 reviews, indicating "generally favorable reviews". Paste writer Robert Ham spoke about Unapologetically, "it’s more country by reputation—and the artful twang in Ballerini’s voice—than in sound. But within the album, the songs eschew lovesick notions and bitter revenge fantasies", noting that, "Unapologetically gains in strength as it goes along, mirroring Ballerini’s push away from a particular lover and towards the welcoming arms of a new beau." Billboard contributor Chuck Dauphin placed two songs from the album on his top 10 list of Ballerini's best songs: "Legends" at number three and the title track at number four.

Accolades

Commercial performance
Unapologetically debuted at number seven on the US Billboard 200 with 44,000 album-equivalent units, including 35,000 pure album sales. It is her highest peak on the chart of her three albums.  The album has sold 156,700 copies in the United States as of October 2019.

Track listing

Personnel
Adapted from AllMusic.

Kelsea Ballerini - lead vocals
Ross Copperman – drum programming
Zach Crowell – acoustic guitar
Jennifer Denmark – background vocals
Kris Donegan – acoustic guitar, electric guitar
David Dorn – keyboards, organ, piano, synthesizer, synthesizer strings
Fred Eltringham – drums
Nicolle Galyon – background vocals
Lee Hendricks – bass guitar
David Hodges – acoustic guitar
Evan Hutchings – drums
Hillary Lindsey – background vocals
Jason Massey – brass arrangements, drum programming, drums, acoustic guitar, electric guitar, mandolin, organ, string arrangements, background vocals
Rob McNelley – acoustic guitar, electric guitar
Lindsey Rimes – bass guitar, acoustic guitar, electric guitar, keyboards, drum programming, string arrangements, background vocals
Jimmy Robbins – acoustic guitar, piano, drum programming
Adam Shoenfeld – electric guitar
Derek Wells – electric guitar, steel guitar
Forest Glen Whitehead – bass guitar, acoustic guitar, electric guitar, keyboards, mandolin, background vocals
Nir Z. – drums

Charts

Weekly charts

Year-end charts

Certifications

References

2017 albums
Kelsea Ballerini albums
Black River Entertainment albums
Albums produced by Lindsay Rimes